Guinea Company may refer to:
Company of Guinea, a Portuguese company
Guinea Company (London), an English company
Guinea Company of Scotland, a short-lived Scottish trading company
Danish Guinea Company, a Dano-Norwegian chartered company

See also 
 Guinea (disambiguation)